Wonggu Mununggurr (c.1880–1959) was an Aboriginal Australian artist and leader of the Djapu clan of the Yolngu people of northeast Arnhem Land in the Northern Territory of Australia.

Biography 
Wonggu Mununggurr was born during 1880 in Northeast Arnhem land. Specifically, he was born in Caledon Bay to the Djapu clan and Dhuwa Moeity. The Djapu are also a part of a large group of aboriginal people known as Yolngu in the North-East Arnhem Land region. Three of his sons were arrested in 1934 for an assault on three Japanese trepangers. Eventually after extensive lobbying they were released in 1936. This led to Wonggu Mununggurr moving his family during the years of 1937-38 from Caledon Bay to the Yirrkala. From here he also helped Donald Thompson with guides and scouts for the area.

Wonggu was an elder in the Djapu clan. While having this high status, he is one of the Yolngu leaders in the Caldeon Bay area. This status stated that Wonggu could have many wives. He was married to multiple women throughout the clan, with whom he had many children. In addition, also brings many distant families for Wonggu. In these types of clans back in this time, most of the children take the same talents as the ancestors. It comes to no surprise that Wonggu's sons have also became well-known artists in this area alongside their dad. Wonggu would sit down with them and teach them how he does his specific style and adds their clan designs into them also.

Donald Thompson created this irregular warfare unit in 1941 during World War II called Northern Territory Special Reconnaissance Unit (NTSRU). NTSRU was mainly made up of aboriginal people from the Northern Territory of Arnhem Land, Australia; such as Wonggu and many of his sons.

Mununggurr met with Donald Thompson at Caledon Bay to set up peace between the nation and government. The friendship was sparked after Mununggurr's children were arrested and gave Thompson a "Måk" (message stick) to give to their father. In return, Mununggurr gave a Måk back to Thompson to deliver to his sons as word of trust to the Yolngu people. He gave Thompson some bark paintings as respect. In 1935, Mununggurr started painted his sacred miny'tl at Yirrkala. The confusing part about his paintings is that Mununggurr was painted the clan designs of Yirritja rather than his own clan designs which were Dhuwa.

In 1936 Wilbur Chaseling along with the support from the Northern Territory Administration (NTA) had surveyed Arnhem Land's coast and chose Yirrkala as the site for a new mission. This was a Methodist Overseas Mission (MOM) whose goal was to spread Christianity as well as help support the Yirrkala community. As the mission gained ground it sought funding from artwork made by local people, Wonggu Mununggurr included.

In 1947 Wonggu Mununggurr alongside many other leaders of the Yirrkala community did a series of paintings. These paintings were originally done in natural pigments on bark amounting to over 200 pieces. Anthropologists Catherine and Ronald Berndt commissioned those works for research and record of indigenous art. Soon thereafter these 200 works were produced the Berndt's recommissioned the art to be done on mediums of crayon and paper so that it could be transported without fear of destruction. Now many of Wonggu Mununggurr's crayon works are held in the Berndt Museum of Anthropology of the University of Western Australia, Perth.

Caledon Bay crisis 
The Caledon Bay crisis became well known after the multiple killings that happened in the Northern territory of Caledon Bay in 1932–1934.  This series of events went from just a few murders to multiple people going missing after trying to investigate the original murders. In conclusion to the Caldeon Bay Crisis, Donald Thompson was sent to the Northern Territory of Arnhem Land to investigate and hopefully deescalate the situation and stop the spread of similar causes throughout Australia. Because of this, Thompson was instructed to form the NTSRU unit as a defence systems from the Japanese raids. From here, there was a strong connection between the Australian Aborigines and European governments, which in turn, sparked a friendly economic systems through commission for their bark art.

In response to the whole crisis, Wonggu decided to move him family away from Caldeon Bay to Yirrkala.

Collections 

 Art Gallery of New South Wales
 Berndt Museum of Anthropology, University of Western Australia
The Donald Thompson Collection on loan to Museums Victoria from the University of Melbourne

Significant exhibitions 

 Ancestral power and the aesthetic: Arnhem Land paintings and objects from the Donald Thomson Collection. Ian Potter Museum of Art, University of Melbourrne. 2 Jun 2009–23 Aug 2009.

Works 

 Wonggu Mununggurr (with sons, Maama, Mawunpuy and Natjiyalma), "Djapu clan, Dhuwa moiety Djapu minytji (Djapu clan design)," 1942 natural pigments on eucalyptus bark 189.4 x 105.2 cm.
 Djapu clan, Dhuwa moiety Sacred and " 'just drawing' minytji (designs)," 1935 natural pigments on eucalyptus bark 60.6 x 143.9 cm.
 Djapu clan, Dhuwa moiety " Marawat (brush/'hair of the head'), " 1935 human hair bound on wood with fibre 7.7 x 0.4 x 0.4 cm.
 Wonggu Mununggurr, "Fish trap at Wandawuy," 1947, lumber crayon on butchers’ paper.
 Wonggu Mununggurr, "Macassan Prau," 1935–45, natural pigments on bark, 1005 x 825mm.
 Wonggu Mununggurr, "Djambuwal (Thunderman) story," 1942, natural pigments on bark, 1052 x 1894mm.

References

External links 
 https://yirrkala.com/djapu/

1880s births
1959 deaths
Yolngu people
Australian artists